Claud Hamilton, 2nd Baron Hamilton of Strabane ( – 1638) was the founder of the Strabane branch of the Hamiltons. He died relatively young at about 32 and his wife, Jean Gordon, married Sir Phelim O'Neill, one of the leaders of the 1641 rebellion, after his death.

Birth and origins 
Claud Hamilton was born near the beginning of the 17th century, probably in Paisley, Scotland. He was the second son of James Hamilton and his wife Marion Boyd. His father had been created Lord Abercorn by James VI and I in 1603 and was further advanced to Earl of Abercorn in 1606. His paternal grandfather was Claud Hamilton, 1st Lord of Paisley. Claud's mother was a daughter of Thomas Boyd, 6th Lord Boyd of Kilmarnock. Both sides of his family were of ancient Scottish nobility.

His father had been a Protestant, but his mother, Marion Boyd, was a Catholic, who brought him, like all his siblings, up in that religion. His uncle George of Greenlaw pushed in the same direction.

Claud had four brothers and four sister, who are listed in his father's article.

Early life and father's succession 
Hamilton matriculated at the University of Glasgow in 1621 but seems to have left university without obtaining a degree.

His father died in 1618. His eldest brother succeeded as 2nd Earl of Abercorn and inherited his father's Scottish estates, but the Irish estates had been settled on him and his younger brothers in his father's will. His was the most prestigious of these properties: the Strabane estate and the castle that his father had built there.

His father had also wanted him to inherit the Irish title as baron Hamilton of Strabane to go with the Strabane estate. However, this proved difficult because of the title's ordinary primogeniture succession. The eldest brother therefore obligatorily succeeded to the title in 1618 and then resigned it, so that the title could be regranted to his younger brother by the crown. This took time and was only to happen in 1633.

His father predeceased his grandfather, who still was Lord of Paisley and held the lands of the former Scottish abbey, which Claud's eldest brother eventually inherited in 1621.

Algeo's crime 
In May 1628 Hamilton's servant Claud Algeo was suspected to be a Catholic and was served with a convocation to appear at the presbytery of Paisley by Ramsay, an officer of the Church of Scotland. However, Algeo assaulted Ramsay and Claud Hamilton supported him. Claud was briefly jailed in June 1628 in Edinburgh Castle for abetting his servant in an assault and ordered to pay £40 to Ramsay. Claud Algeo fled to his master's Irish estates.

Lord Strabane by regrant 
In 1633, his elder brother, James, the 2nd Earl of Abercorn in Scotland and the 1st Baron Hamilton of Strabane in Ireland, resigned his Irish title to the crown, which regranted it to Claud on 14 August 1634, with the original precedence. He thereby became the 2nd Baron Hamilton of Strabane.

Marriage and children 
On 28 November 1632, Lord Strabane, as he was now, married Jean Gordon, fourth daughter of George Gordon, 1st Marquess of Huntly. The Huntlys were a Catholic family from Aberdeenshire Scotland.

 
Claud and Jean had two sons:
James (1633 – 1655), became the 3rd Baron Hamilton of Strabane
George (1636/7 – 1668), became the 4th Baron Hamilton of Strabane

—and two daughters:
Catherine (died 1670/1), married James Hamilton of Manorhamilton, the eldest brother of Gustavus Hamilton, 1st Viscount Boyne and two other husbands afterwards
Cecilia, also called Mariana, married Richard Perkins of Lifford

Death and timeline 
Lord Strabane died on 14 June 1638, probably at the Castle of Strabane, and was buried at Leckpatrick, Strabane, County Tyrone. He was only in his thirties. His eldest son, James, succeeded him at the age of five as the 3rd Baron Hamilton of Strabane. His widow married Sir Phelim O'Neill in November 1649.

Notes and references

Notes

Citations

Sources 

  – 1627 to 1628
 
  – G to K
  – 1649 to 1664 (for George Hamilton )
  – Ab-Adam to Basing (for Abercorn)
 
  – (for timeline)
 
  – Viscounts (for Boyne, Strabane)
 
  
  – Abercorn to Balmerino (for Abercorn)
  – Panmure to Sinclair (for Sempill)

Further reading 
  – (Snippet view)

Hamilton of Strabane, Claud Hamilton, 2nd Baron
Hamilton of Strabane, Claud Hamilton, 2nd Baron
17th-century Irish people
Hamilton of Strabane, Claud Hamilton, 2nd Baron
Hamilton of Strabane, Claud Hamilton, 2nd Baron
Claud
Hamilton of Strabane, Claud Hamilton, 2nd Baron